Sergio Llopis Solís (born August 18, 1978 in Xàtiva, Valencia) is a male badminton player from Spain.

Career

2004 Summer Olympics
Llopis played badminton at the 2004 Summer Olympics in the men's singles competition, losing in the round of 32 to Nikhil Kanetkar of India. He also played in the men's doubles with partner José Antonio Crespo.  They were defeated in the round of 32 by Lee Dong-soo and Yoo Yong-sung of Korea.

Major achievements

References

1978 births
Living people
People from Xàtiva
Sportspeople from the Province of Valencia
Spanish male badminton players
Badminton players at the 2004 Summer Olympics
Olympic badminton players of Spain